is a Japanese manga artist working for various magazines within the Shueisha lines, including Weekly Shōnen Jump and Super Jump. Born in Ōtoyo in the prefecture of Kōchi on March 1, 1959, he originally got notice from a placing entry in the 17th Akatsuka Award for his story  in 1982. His first series, soon followed, running between 1983 and 1985 in Weekly Shōnen Jump and quickly established him as not only a gag manga artist but one who balanced in dramatic elements into his stories as well. His most well known work,  (a bizarre take on Edgar Rice Burroughs' famous jungle hero Tarzan), became a Weekly Shōnen Jump staple during its run between 1988 and 1995.

Tokuhiro incorporates many of his loves in his stories, including guns, bodybuilding and muscular physiques (for both males and females) as well as Shorinji Kempo.

One of the few assistants he has used in his work was a young Eiichiro Oda, who has admitted to taking many of the ideas and styles from Tokuhiro but has had little contact with him since those days.

Works

Shape Up Ran (シェイプアップ乱 Sheipu appu Ran), Weekly Shōnen Jump (1983 - 1986, 14 volumes)
Fundoshi Keiji Ken-chan to Chako-chan (ふんどし刑事ケンちゃんとチャコちゃん), Super Jump (1986 - 1990, 2 volumes)
, Weekly Shōnen Jump (1988 - 1990, 7 volumes)
, Weekly Shōnen Jump (1990 - 1995, 20 volumes)
Kyōshirō 2030 (狂四郎2030), Super Jump (1997 - 2004, 20 volumes)
Fuguman (ふぐマン), Super Jump ( 2008 - 2010, 6 volumes)
Teishu Genki de Inu ga Ii (亭主元気で犬がいい), Big Comic Superior (2010 - 2013, 8 volumes)
Kōmon-sama - Suke-san no Yūutsu (黄門さま〜助さんの憂鬱〜), Grand Jump (2013 - 2015, 6 volumes)

References

1959 births
Living people
Manga artists from Kōchi Prefecture